Soshanguve is a township situated about 30 km north of Pretoria, Gauteng, South Africa along Mabopane, and Ga-Rankuwa.
The name Soshanguve is an
acronym for Sotho, Shangaan,
Nguni and Venda, thus showing
the multi-ethnic composition of
the population. The major African
languages of South Africa are
heard in Soshanguve.

History

The acronym divided the Soshanguve
residents according to their tribe when
they were resettled from Mamelodi and
Atteridgeville in 1974. While this was to
make admin easy for the apartheid
government, it left a community divided
and suspicious of each other.
More than 20 years later, there are still
remnants of the past but there is
integration of cultures. The people of
Soshanguve arguably are the most multilingual of South Africans.

Culture

The people of Soshanguve speak Pretoria Sotho called Se Pitori & Listen to local music genre called Barcadi & Amapiano.

Educational Institutions 

Soshanguve is home to Tshwane University of Technology's Soshanguve North & South Campuses & Tshwane north college (TNC) which draw their students from every corner of the country.

Places of interest

 The second fab lab in South Africa is located in Soshanguve Block TT where it is operated by a self-organized group of unemployed youth known as the Bright Youth Council.
 Tswaing Crater - Tswaing, meaning Place of Salt in Setswana, is a 2000-hectare heritage site, some 40 km north-west of Central Pretoria, surrounded by settlements inhabited by more than a million people, such as Winterveld, Soshanguve, Mabopane and Eersterus, near Hammanskraal.
 Giant Stadium
 Soshanguve Crossing Mall
 Soshanguve Railway Station

Notable people 

Black Motion
DJ Maphorisa
Warren Masemola

References

Townships in Gauteng
Populated places in the City of Tshwane